Delias mandaya  is a species of pierine butterfly endemic to Mindanao, in the Philippines. The type locality is the Tagubud Mountains, Mindanao. It may be a subspecies of Delias levicki.

References

mandaya
Butterflies described in 1982